Runaway Railway is a 1965 British family adventure film directed by Jan Darnley-Smith and starring John Moulder-Brown, Kevin Bennett, Ronnie Barker and Graham Stark. The screenplay concerns a group of children who manage to foil an attempted mail train robbery, with similarities to the Great Train Robbery of 1963.

Cast
 John Moulder-Brown - Charlie
 Kevin Bennett - Arthur
 Leonard Brockwell - John
 Roberta Tovey - Carole
 Sydney Tafler - Mr. Jones
 Ronnie Barker - Mr. Galore
 Graham Stark - Grampole
 Jon Pertwee - Station Master
 Hugh Lloyd - Disposals Man
 Roger Avon - Waterhouse
 Bruce Wightman - Llewellyn

Filming locations
Filmed at Longmoor Military Railway, Paddington Station and Pinewood Studios.

References

External links

1965 films
British adventure films
Rail transport films
1965 adventure films
1960s English-language films
1960s British films